Bang is a single made by American rappers Conway the Machine and Eminem. The song was released as a non-album single despite being originally made for Conway's second studio album, God Don't Make Mistakes. A remix of the song was made for WWCD, the first Griselda album.

Production 
The song was mainly produced by Butcha Beats and Daringer, with some additional production coming from Eminem and Luis Resto. Butcha, Daringer, Eminem, and Luis also co-wrote the song with Conway.

Critical reception 
Billboard called the collaboration between Eminem and Conway "explosive." HotNewHipHop said "The union between Shady Records and Griselda has manifested in apocalyptic fashion." XXL mentioned the song multiple times, saying the same thing all times: "it offers a plethora of bars" and its "a song that lives up to its own name"

Commercial performance 
The song only charted on one chart, despite the positive reviews. It reached number 16 on the Rap Digital Song Sales chart on August 3, 2019.

References

2019 singles
2019 songs
Eminem songs